St Just in Penwith was an electoral division of Cornwall in the United Kingdom which returned one member to sit on Cornwall Council between 2009 and 2021. It was abolished at the 2021 local elections, being succeeded by the Land's End division.

Councillors

Extent
The division represented the town of St Just, the villages of Pendeen, Boscaswell, Trewellard, and Botallack as well as the hamlets of Carnyorth, Higher Boscaswell, Tregeseal and Kelynack. The division also included Land's End Airport.

The division was nominally abolished during boundary changes at the 2013 election. From 2009 to 2013, the division covered 3103 hectares in total; after the boundary changes in 2013, it covered 3093 hectares.

Election results

2017 election

2013 election

2009 election

References

Electoral divisions of Cornwall Council
St Just in Penwith